Manuel Fernández or Fernandez may refer to:

Military
Manuel Fernández Castrillón (1780s–1836), Mexican general
Manuel Fernández Silvestre (1871–1921), Spanish general
Manuel J. Fernandez (1925–1980), American pilot in Korean War

Sports

Association football (soccer)
Manuel Fernandez (footballer) (1922–1971), French-Spanish football defender
Pahiño (Manuel Fernández Fernández, 1923–2012), Spanish footballer
Manuel Fernández Mora (1932–2017), Spanish football player and manager
Manuel Fernández Muñiz (born 1986), Spanish footballer
Manuel Fernández (Argentine footballer) (born 1983), Argentine football manager and former footballer
Manuel Fernández (Uruguayan footballer) (born 1989), Uruguayan footballer

Other sports
Manuel José Fernández (born 1927), Argentine Olympic shooter
Manuel Fernández (rower) (fl. 1940s), Argentine Olympic rower
Manuel Fernández (field hockey) (born 1948), Mexican field hockey player
Manuel Montoya Fernández (born 1959), Spanish handball manager
Manuel Fernández Ginés (born 1971), Spanish cyclist
Manuel Fernández Saro (born 1975), Spanish show jumping rider

Others
Manuel Fernández Caballero (1835–1906), Spanish composer
Manuel Fernández Juncos (1846–1928), Spanish journalist and author
Manuel Fernández Álvarez (1921–2010), Spanish historian and writer
Manuel Fernandez (businessman) (born 1946), American businessman

See also
Manny Fernandez (disambiguation)
Manuel Fernandes (disambiguation)